Margaret Cox is an Irish politician.

Margaret Cox may also refer to:

Margie Cox, American singer
Margaret Cox (athlete) (1914–2004), English athlete